Park Ye-eun (born 17 October 1996) is a South Korean footballer who plays as a midfielder for Brighton & Hove Albion in the Women's Super League.

Career

Park started her career with South Korean side Gyeongju Korea Hydro & Nuclear Power WFC. In 2022, she signed for Brighton & Hove Albion in England.

Career statistics

Club

International 

Scores and results list South Korea's goal tally first, score column indicates score after each Park goal.

References

External links
 

1996 births
Living people
South Korean women's footballers
South Korea women's under-20 international footballers
South Korea women's international footballers
Women's association football midfielders
Brighton & Hove Albion W.F.C. players
South Korean expatriate footballers
Expatriate women's footballers in England
South Korean expatriate sportspeople in England
WK League players
Women's Super League players